Aartsen or van Aartsen is a Dutch surname. People with this surname include:

 Jan van Aartsen (1909–1992), Dutch politician
 Jozias van Aartsen (born 1947), Dutch politician
 Stefan Aartsen (born 1975), Dutch swimmer

References 

Dutch-language surnames
Patronymic surnames